Cyclophora antennaria is a moth in the family Geometridae first described by E. Dukinfield Jones in 1921. It is found in Brazil.

References

Moths described in 1921
Cyclophora (moth)
Moths of South America